Ham Fen is a   nature reserve south of Sandwich in Kent. It is one of  Kent Wildlife Trust's nature reserves and is being extended in 2018 by an extra 33 acres.

This old fenland site has wet grassland with deep mires, dykes and ditches, and is the last surviving ancient fen habitat in Kent. The reserve was established in 1991 and as of mid-2018 covers over 100 acres. Considerable damage was caused by two major episodes of land drainage in the 18th century and early 1980s, which led to significant habitat deterioration and loss of wetland species.

Work to repair the natural environment includes the successful reintroduction of beavers to the site, which first took place in 2002.

The site is not open to the public.

References

Nature reserves in Kent